The 2019 Dover District Council election took place on 2 May 2019 to elect members of the Dover District Council in Kent, England. It was held on the same day as other local elections. It was the first election to be held after boundary changes reduced the number of seats from 45 to 32. The Conservative Party retained overall control of the council.

Summary

Election result

|-

Ward results

Alkham and Capel-le-Ferne

Aylesham, Eythorne and Shepherdswell

Buckland

Dover Downs and River

Eastry Rural

Guston, Kingsdown and St. Margaret's-at-Cliffe

Little Stour and Ashstone

Maxton and Elms Vale

Middle Deal

Mill Hill

North Deal

Sandwich

St. Radigund's

Tower Hamlets

Town and Castle

Walmer

Whitfield

By-elections

Guston, Kingsdown and St Margaret's-at-Cliffe

Mill Hill

Alkham & Capel-Le-Ferne

Sandwich

References

2019 English local elections
May 2019 events in the United Kingdom
2019
2010s in Kent